Khan Joynul was a Bangladeshi film actor. He was known for acting in comic roles. He appeared in many films.

Biography
Joynul made his debut in Dhallywood with 13 Number Feku Ostagar Lane. He was the story and dialogue writer of that film too. He acted in films like Nacher Putul, Chhondo Hariye Gelo and Abujh Mon.

Joynul died on 15 January 1976.

Selected filmography
 13 Number Feku Ostagar Lane
 Abujh Mon
 Chhondo Hariye Gelo
Alor Michil
 Sutorang
 Dak Peon
 Kachkata Hire
 Dorpochurno
 Soptodinga
 Missor Kumari
 Ontorongo
 Matir Maya
 Oshanto Dhew
 Diner Por Din
 Smriti Tumi Bedona
 Moynamoti
 Saiful Mulk Badiuzzaman
 Gopal Var
 Modhu Milon
 Diwana

References

External links

1976 deaths
Bangladeshi male film actors
Bangladeshi film actors